In enzymology, an iodophenol O-methyltransferase is an enzyme that catalyzes the chemical reaction

S-adenosyl-L-methionine + 2-iodophenol  S-adenosyl-L-homocysteine + 2-iodophenol methyl ether

Thus, the two substrates of this enzyme are S-adenosyl methionine and 2-iodophenol, whereas its two products are S-adenosylhomocysteine and 2-iodophenol methyl ether.

This enzyme belongs to the family of transferases, specifically those transferring one-carbon group methyltransferases.  The systematic name of this enzyme class is S-adenosyl-L-methionine:2-iodophenol O-methyltransferase.

References

 

EC 2.1.1
Enzymes of unknown structure